Hamilton was a burgh constituency represented in the House of Commons of the Parliament of the United Kingdom from 1918 to 1997. It elected one Member of Parliament (MP) by the first past the post voting system.

History 
The constituency was formed by the division of Lanarkshire constituency. The constituency was split in 1997 to form Hamilton North & Bellshill and Hamilton South.

Boundaries 
From 1918 the constituency consisted of "The burgh of Hamilton and the part of the Middle Ward County District which is contained within the extraburghal portion of the parish of Hamilton and the parish of Dalserf."

Members of Parliament

Election results

Elections in the 1910s

Elections in the 1920s

Elections in the 1930s

Elections in the 1940s

Elections in the 1950s

Elections in the 1960s

Elections of the 1970s

Elections of the 1980s

Elections of the 1990s

References 

Historic parliamentary constituencies in Scotland (Westminster)
Constituencies of the Parliament of the United Kingdom established in 1918
Constituencies of the Parliament of the United Kingdom disestablished in 1997
Politics of South Lanarkshire
Hamilton, South Lanarkshire